Edberg is a village in central Alberta, Canada.

Johan Edstrom, an early postmaster, named the village after himself.

Demographics 

In the 2016 Census of Population conducted by Statistics Canada, the Village of Edberg recorded a population of 151 living in 61 of its 65 total private dwellings, a  change from its 2011 population of 168.

See also 
List of communities in Alberta
List of villages in Alberta

References

External links 

1930 establishments in Alberta
Villages in Alberta
Camrose County
Populated places established in 1930